La Gare de Troyes is a concept album by the French progressive rock band Ange; it was also a play and a ballet. It was released in 1983.

Track listing
Side One:
"La Gare De Troyes"  – 03:41
"A Saute-Mouton"  – 04:21
"Questions D'générations"  – 04:13
"Va-T'en"  – 04:24
"Les Moments Bizarres"  – 04:31
Side Two:
"Shéhérazade"  – 04:14
"Les Jardins"  – 03:51
"Neuf Heures"  – 04:33
"Tout Bleu !"  – 09:18

Personnel
 Lead Vocals, Pianos: Christian Decamps
 Keyboards, Backing Vocals: Francis Decamps
 Guitar: Serge Cuenot
 Bass: Laurent Sigrist
 Drums, Percussion: Jean-Claude Potin

Additional Musicians 
 Vocals: Guy Boley
 Vocals: Tristan Gros
 Saxophone: Marc Fontana
 Emulator, PPG, Programmation: Guy Battarel
 Backing Vocals: Anne
 Backing Vocals: Maria

References
La Gare de Troyes on ange-updlm (in French)
La Gare de Troyes on www.discogs.com

1983 albums
Ange albums